The Istanbul Cooperation Initiative (ICI) is a NATO initiative that was launched during the organisation's 2004 Istanbul summit.

During the summit, NATO leaders decided to elevate the Alliance's Mediterranean Dialogue to a genuine partnership and to launch the ICI with selected countries in the broader region of the Middle East. The initiative is an offer to engage in practical security cooperation activities with states throughout the Greater Middle East. This new initiative stands alongside NATO's Partnership for Peace Program and the Mediterranean Dialogue. NATO itself regards these security cooperation partnerships as a response to the new challenges of the 21st century and as a complement to the G8 and U.S.-EU decisions to support calls for reform from within the Broader Middle East region. The ICI offers practical cooperation with interested nations in the Greater Middle East in such areas as:
 Counter-WMD;
 Counterterrorism;
 Training and education;
 Participation in NATO exercises;
 Promoting military interoperability;
 Disaster preparedness and civil emergency planning;
 Tailored advice on defense reform and civil-military relations; and
 Cooperation on border security to help prevent illicit trafficking of drugs, weapons, and people.

Members
 Bahrain
 Qatar
 Kuwait
 United Arab Emirates

References

Politics of NATO
2004 in international relations